Maina Maaji Lawan (born 12 July 1954) is a Nigerian politician. He is a former governor and former senator for Borno State. A businessman, farmer and the CEO of Dansarki Farms.

Background

Maina Ma’aji Lawan, CON, was born 12 July 1954 at Kauwa in Kukawa Local Government Area of Borno State, Nigeria. He finished his primary education at Kukawa in 1967 and proceeded to Government College Keffi for his secondary education between 1968 and 1972. In 1977, he graduated from Ahmadu Bello University, iwhere he obtained a BSc degree in business administration, specializing in finance.

Political career
While in active politics, he was a member of the Social Democratic Party (SDP), the Great Nigerian Peoples Party (GNPP), The Peoples Democratic Party (PDP), the All Nigerian Peoples Party (ANPP), and the All Progressives Congress (APC). He was elected into the House of Representatives at the age of twenty-four on the platform of the GNPP to represent Kukawa Southeast Federal constituency between 1979 and 1983.

In December 1991, Lawan was elected Governor of Borno State and served until the 17th of November 1993 when the third republic was aborted by a military coup. In the transition programmes that followed, Lawan was elected Senator for Borno Nort first in 1998 on the platform of UNCP under the Abacha Transition which was itself aborted and thereafter elected three times into the Senate from the same constituency, his last election being in 2011 after which he declined to contest.

During his sojourn in the Senate, Lawan was at various times the Deputy Senate Leader, Senate Minority leader, chairman Senate committees on special projects, National Population and Identity, Vice Chairman Senate committees on appropriation and Independent National Electoral Commission (INEC) as well as member of several standing and ad-hoc committees including but not limited to National Security and Intelligence, Constitutional Amendment, Finance, Petroleum, and Niger Delta Development Commission.

In 2011, Lawan was conferred with the National Honour of the “Commander of the Order of Niger” (CON) based on his various roles in national development.

Business endeavour
Lawan established several businesses from the early 1980s to date.

He was the managing director of Madison Nigeria Limited (1982-1991), chairman and CEO of Comodex Ltd (1995 to date), Chairman CEO KBB Engineering Ltd 1999 to date and Chairman CEO of Dansarki Farms Ltd (2007 to date).

References 

Living people
1954 births
Nigerian Muslims
Governors of Borno State
Peoples Democratic Party members of the Senate (Nigeria)
All Nigeria Peoples Party politicians
Members of the House of Representatives (Nigeria)
20th-century Nigerian politicians
21st-century Nigerian politicians